The  is a venue that hosted the rowing event at the 1964 Summer Olympics. Originally completed in 1939 for the 1940 Summer Olympics that were cancelled due to World War II. After World War II, the venue was left in disrepair. When Tokyo was awarded the 1964 Summer Olympics in 1958, the venue was expanded and reconstructed.

It is located on an embankment of the Arakawa River in the Saitama Prefecture near Tokyo.

References
1964 Summer Olympics official report. Volume 1. Part 1. pp. 130–131.

Venues of the 1964 Summer Olympics
Olympic rowing venues
Sports venues in Saitama Prefecture
Toda, Saitama
Sports venues completed in 1939
1939 establishments in Japan